Reverend John Kinnear (1824–1909) was an Irish Liberal party politician and Presbyterian minister.  He was elected to the United Kingdom House of Commons as Member of Parliament (MP) for Donegal at the 1880 general election, and held the seat until the constituency was divided for the 1885 general election. 

Kinnear was born in Clonaneese near Dungannon in County Tyrone, and was educated in Royal Belfast Academical Institution, ordained a minister 1848, and spent most of his life in Letterkenny. He was the first clergyman to be elected to the house of commons. Kinnear Lane in Letterkenny is named after him. Dr. Kinnear was a champion of tenant's rights.

He died in 1909 and is buried in the graveyard of Conwal Parish Church, Letterkenny.

References

External links 

1824 births
1909 deaths
People_educated_at_the_Royal_Belfast_Academical_Institution
Members of the Parliament of the United Kingdom for County Donegal constituencies (1801–1922)
UK MPs 1880–1885
Irish Presbyterian ministers